Leibovici is a surname. Notable people with the surname include:
 Ernestine Leibovici (1913–1988), more commonly known as Eren Eyüboğlu, Romanian-born Turkish painter and mosaic artist.
 Karen Leibovici (born 1952), is a Canadian politician.
 Karen Leibovici (sailor) (born 1971), is a French sailor.
 Margaret Kelly Leibovici (1910–2004), was an Irish dancer who was the founder of the Bluebell Girls dance troupe.

See also
Leibovich
Leibowitz